Hemiaclis obtusa is a species of sea snail, a marine gastropod mollusk in the family Eulimidae.

Description
The length of the shell measures approximately 5.5 mm in length and can be located at depths of roughly 1500 m below sea level.

Distribution
This species occurs in the following locations:
 European waters (ERMS scope)
 United Kingdom Exclusive Economic Zone

References

 Hoffman L. & Freiwald A. (2020). Bathyal Eulimidae (Gastropoda: Vanikoroidea) from the Azorean seamounts collected during the R/V Meteor Cruise M151 Athena. Miscellanea Malacologica. 8(6): 81-99.

External links
  Serge GOFAS, Ángel A. LUQUE, Joan Daniel OLIVER,José TEMPLADO & Alberto SERRA (2021) - The Mollusca of Galicia Bank (NE Atlantic Ocean); European Journal of Taxonomy 785: 1–114
 To World Register of Marine Species

Eulimidae
Gastropods described in 1986